Dionysius II, (? – July 1556) was Ecumenical Patriarch of Constantinople from 1546 to 1556.

Life
Dionysius was born in Galata (now part of Istanbul). In 1516 he was appointed Metropolitan of Nicomedia and he was consecrated bishop by Patriarch Theoleptus I.

Dionysius was designed by Patriarch Jeremias I as his successor, and, after Jeremias' death, he was actually elected on 17 April 1546 supported by popular manifestations and against the hopes of the Holy Synod. During his Patriarchate he was blamed for having raised the appointment fee (peshtesh) due to the Ottoman Sultan to three thousand Écus and for the demolition, ordered by the Sultan, of the great cross on the roof of the Pammakaristos Church, at the time the seat of the Patriarchate.

The more significant event of his patriarchate was the 1546 travel in Italy of the young Metropolitan of Caesaria, Metrophanes, who years later would become Patriarch. Dionysius sent Metrophanes to Venice mainly to raise funds, but Metrophanes went also to Rome and met the Pope. In 1548 these news caused a great concern in a part of the Greek population of Constantinople, with riots and an attempt to murder Dionysius, who was considered as guilty as Metrophanes. Dionysius was on the point of being deposed, but no actions were taken against him because he enjoyed the support of Suleiman the Magnificent.

Dionysius reigned until he died. The date of his death is disputed among scholars, and various dates have been proposed, such as 1554 and 1555, but the correct date seems to be July 1556, a conclusion supported by Venetian documents. He was buried in the Kamariotissa Monastery on the island of Chalki.

References

Sources
 

1556 deaths
16th-century Ecumenical Patriarchs of Constantinople
16th-century Greek clergy
16th-century Eastern Orthodox bishops
Year of birth unknown
Bishops of Nicomedia
Clergy from Istanbul
Constantinopolitan Greeks
People from Beyoğlu
People from Galata